John Hugh James MC & Bar (4 May 1890 – 23 April 1967) was an Australian rules footballer who played in the VFL between 1909 and 1916 and, upon returning from military service, from 1919 to 1923 for the Richmond Football Club.

Football

Third Divisional team (AIF)

He played for the (winning) Third Australian Divisional team in the famous "Pioneer Exhibition Game" of Australian Rules football, held in London, in October 1916. A news film was taken at the match.

Military service
He served in the Australian Imperial Force from 1916 to 1919. Rising to the rank of lieutenant, he was wounded on active duty and twice awarded the Military Cross for bravery in the battlefield.

See also
 1916 Pioneer Exhibition Game

Notes

References 
 Pioneer Exhibition Game Australian Football: in aid of British and French Red Cross Societies: 3rd Australian Division v. Australian Training Units at Queen's Club, West Kensington, on Saturday, October 28th, 1916, at 3pm, Wightman & Co., (London), 1919.
 de Lacy, H.A., "Hughie James Comes Home and Talks of Some Great Men in a Great Game", The Sporting Globe, (Saturday, 30 April 1938), p.8.
 Hogan P: The Tigers Of Old, Richmond FC, Melbourne 1996

 First World War Embarkation Roll: Lance-Sergeant John Hugh James (223), collection of the Australian War Memorial.
 First World War Nominal Roll: Lieutenant John Hugh James, Australian War Museum.
 First World War Service Record: Lieutenant John Hugh James, National Archives of Australia.
 Photograph at Picture Victoria.
 Photograph at :File:Richmond_fc_1920.jpg, third from left, back row.
 Photograph at :File:Richmond_fc_1921.jpg, second from left, middle row.
 Richardson, N. (2016), The Game of Their Lives, Pan Macmillan Australia: Sydney.

External links
 
 
 Richmond Football Club – Hall of Fame.
 Boyles Football Photos: Hughie James.
 The VFA Project: Hugh James — note that if (apart from his time with Preston in 1907 and 1908) he had played for Essendon (Association) in 1902, as this mistaken record claims, he would only have been 12 years old at the time.

1890 births
1967 deaths
Australian Army soldiers
Australian military personnel of World War I
Australian recipients of the Military Cross
Richmond Football Club players
Richmond Football Club Premiership players
Participants in "Pioneer Exhibition Game" (London, 28 October 1916)
Essendon Association Football Club players
Preston Football Club (VFA) players
Australian rules footballers from Victoria (Australia)
People from Sale, Victoria
Two-time VFL/AFL Premiership players
Military personnel from Victoria (Australia)